1 Samuel 3 is the third chapter of the First Book of Samuel in the Old Testament of the Christian Bible or the first part of the Books of Samuel in the Hebrew Bible. According to Jewish tradition  the book was attributed to the prophet Samuel, with additions by the prophets Gad and Nathan, but modern scholars view it as a composition of a number of independent texts of various ages from c. 630–540 BCE. This chapter focuses on the calling of Samuel, in a section concerning the life of Samuel (1 Samuel 1:1–7:17).

Text
This chapter was originally written in the Hebrew language. It is divided into 21 verses.

Textual witnesses
Some early manuscripts containing the text of this chapter in Hebrew are of the Masoretic Text tradition, which includes the Codex Cairensis (895), Aleppo Codex (10th century), and Codex Leningradensis (1008). Fragments containing parts of this chapter in Hebrew were found among the Dead Sea Scrolls including 4Q51 (4QSam; 100–50 BCE) with extant verses 1–4, 18–21.

Extant ancient manuscripts of a translation into Koine Greek known as the Septuagint (originally was made in the last few centuries BCE) include Codex Vaticanus (B; B; 4th century) and Codex Alexandrinus (A; A; 5th century).

Old Testament references
: ;  (perpetual lamp)
:  (ark of God; ark of the Covenant)
:  (ark kept at worship center)

Period 
 The event in this chapter happened at the end of judges period in Israel, about 1100 BC.

Analysis
Chapter 3 is tied in many ways to chapter 2, with some terms and themes in chapter 2 are repeated or recapitulated in chapter 3:

God calls Samuel (3:1–14)
This section on Samuel's calling is often classified as a "prophetic call narrative", within the tradition of the calling of major prophets (cf. Exodus 3–4; Isaiah 6; Jeremiah 1:4–10; Ezekiel 1:1–3:16). In a period when divine visions were infrequent, Samuel received his call-vision which would shift the seat of power from Eli and his family. While Eli was still presiding for a short period, he instructed Samuel of the right words of response to God's calling (verses 9–10), but after Samuel received God's oracle (verses 11–14), Samuel became more powerful than Eli before the eyes of the people.

Verse 1
Now the boy Samuel was ministering to the Lord before Eli. And the word of the Lord was rare in those days. There was no vision coming forth.

According to Josephus, Samuel was twelve years old at this time.

Samuel shares his first vision (3:15–21)

Samuel's oracle of doom over Eli's house confirms the words of the man of God in 2:27-36: the house of Eli will fall because of the iniquity of his sons and his own inability to admonish them. Eli accepted God's verdict (verse 18) and that Samuel would become a 'powerful prophet whose words were fulfilled', not only in Shiloh, but throughout the land of Israel (verses 20–21).<ref name=benson>Benson, Joseph. [http://biblehub.com/commentaries/benson/1_samuel/3.htm '’Commentary on the Old and New Testaments. 1 Samuel 3.] Accessed 9 Juli 2019.</ref>

"Was established": can also be rendered as "was confirmed", "found faithful" or "approved"; from Hebrew word that in 1 Samuel 2:35 is rendered as 'a faithful priest' and 'a sure'' house'.

See also

Related Bible parts: 1 Samuel 1, 1 Samuel 2

Notes

References

Sources

Commentaries on Samuel

General

External links
 Jewish translations:
 Shmuel I - I Samuel - Chapter 3 (Judaica Press). Hebrew text and English translation [with Rashi's commentary] at Chabad.org
 Christian translations:
 Online Bible at GospelHall.org (ESV, KJV, Darby, American Standard Version, Bible in Basic English)
 1 Samuel chapter 3. Bible Gateway

03